Novy Charysh is a rural locality (a settlement) in Ust-Kalmansky District, Altai Krai, Russia. The population was 208 as of 2013. There are 2 streets.

Geography 
Novy Charysh is located 8 km northeast of Ust-Kalmanka (the district's administrative centre) by road. Charyshskoye is the nearest rural locality.

References 

Rural localities in Ust-Kalmansky District